Angel Marin (born 8 January 1942) is a Bulgarian political figure who was Vice President of Bulgaria from 2002 to 2012. He took office in 2002 together with President Georgi Parvanov, and they were re-elected for a second term in 2007.

Early life 
Marin was born in Batak and completed his high school education in Devin in 1960. From 1960 until 1965 he attended the Higher Military Artillery School in Shumen, majoring in Ground Artillery. In addition he received Civilian degree in Radio Electronics Engineering.

Between 1974 and 1978 he attended The Military Artillery Academy in Saint Petersburg. He graduated with distinction and a gold medal in "Command of Chief of Staff HQ and Operative-Tactical". He received University degree in military education.

By the end of July 2011, President Parvanov and Vice President Marin, who had been delegated the presidential power to issue pardons, had pardoned 431 criminals.

References

External links
 Official site

1942 births
Bulgarian generals
Vice presidents of Bulgaria
Living people